Borówno  is a village in the administrative district of Gmina Czarny Bór, within Wałbrzych County, Lower Silesian Voivodeship, in south-western Poland.

The village has a population of 650.

Settlement of Polish Highlanders from Podhale 
Whereas most of the former German and Czech settlements of Lower Silesia and the County of Kladsko were repopulated by Poles from regions east of the Curzon line and from war-devastated central Poland after World War II, Borówno and neighboring Czarny Bór were settled by a group of Górals. These Polish Highlanders from the Podhale region created a new home in this area as well as in the nearby village of Krajanów. While the new inhabitants initially cultivated their unique customs and folklore, these traditions have disappeared over time, although recently there have been efforts towards a cultural revival.

Gallery

References

Villages in Wałbrzych County